Grove Music may refer to:

 The New Grove Dictionary of Music and Musicians
 Grove Music, a company owned by composer and arranger Gwyn Arch